Artur Mahraun (30 December 1890 – 29 March 1950) was the founder and leader of the Young German Order (Jungdeutscher Orden or Jungdo) and an early contender for the leadership of the far right youth in Weimar Germany.

Born the son of a privy councillor in Kassel, Mahraun became a career soldier with the Prussian Army when he enlisted in the Prussian Infantry Regiment No. 83 in 1908. He served with distinction on the Eastern Front during First World War.

Like many of his contemporaries he became involved in Freikorps activity after the Armistice, forming his own group, the Offizierkompagnie Kassel in January 1919. The group was restructured in May 1920 when the Jungdo was adopted and by 1921 Mahraun could call on 70,000 followers. A strong believer in law and order, he rejected revolutionary activity and instead called for Germany to reconcile with France and rebuild her prestige through Franco-German co-operation. At its peak Mahraun's movement, which sought a return to the Wandervogel spirit, could call on as many as 300,000 followers. After meeting Adolf Hitler during the Beer Hall Putsch he quickly became a critic of the Nazi leader.

Mahraun entered the political arena in 1928 when he formed the People's National Reich Association (Völksnationale Reichsvereiningung) as an electoral arm of his movement, merging it with the German Democratic Party to form the German State Party in 1930. However the move was not a success as the new party performed very poorly at election. Mahraun's party and Jungdo were banned in 1933 and he was for a time imprisoned by the Gestapo.

He was briefly associated with a group called the Nachbarschafts-Bewegung after the war until his death in Gütersloh in 1950.

References

1890 births
1950 deaths
Politicians from Kassel
People from Hesse-Nassau
German State Party politicians
Young German Order members
Conservative Revolutionary movement
Prussian Army personnel
German Army personnel of World War I
20th-century Freikorps personnel